Concrete Jungle is an indie strategy video game developed and published by British studio ColePowered Games. The game was released in September 2015 on Microsoft Windows and OS X and in September 2016 for iOS. The game is the successor to MegaCity.

Gameplay

Concrete Jungle is card-based city-building game in which the player must use different types of cards to reach the required point count for each row.

References

External links

2015 video games
IOS games
Windows games
MacOS games
Android (operating system) games
Strategy video games
Video games developed in the United Kingdom